"Some Guys Have All the Luck" is a song written by Jeff Fortgang, which has been a Top 40 hit on the Billboard Hot 100 twice, first by The Persuaders in 1973 reaching No. 39, then by Rod Stewart in 1984 where it hit No. 10 in the U.S. and No. 32 on the Adult Contemporary chart.

Background
Fortgang wrote many songs during his three years in the music industry after graduating Yale in 1971. While Fortgang eventually released a solo album in 2013, titled All the Music in the World, consisting of the demos he had created in the 1970s, "Some Guys Have All the Luck" was not one of the tracks.

Original Persuaders version
The single was released from The Persuaders' album, Best Thing That Ever Happened to Me. It was their last Top 40 hit in the United States, peaking at No. 7 on the R&B chart and No. 39 on the Billboard Hot 100 in December 1973.

Chart history

Robert Palmer version

In 1982, English singer Robert Palmer released a version of the song as a single from his live/studio album Maybe It's Live. It reached No. 16 in the UK Singles Chart.

Palmer's version has a significantly altered melody and lyrics in comparison to other versions of the song. Palmer told Max Bell in 1989: "I was working with Moon Martin when I wrote "Some Guys". I played it to him and a few days later he said he'd just heard someone singing it in the studio across the road, which seemed impossible since I hadn't finished it myself! What happened was that I must have heard it subliminally, I think it was on Australian radio, and just hadn't realised. The only thing I remembered was the title line."

Reception
Upon release, Ian Birch of Smash Hits described Palmer's version as "a great combination of limb-loosening rhythm and immediate melody" and predicted the song would reach the UK Top 5. Billboard considered it "one of Palmer's most enticing singles" since "Every Kinda People". They also noted the "offbeat rhythm" and "eccentric arrangement". Cash Box commented: "This cover paints yet another picture of the ever-changing Palmer. Here he plays a jumpy electronic popper".

Chart history

Rod Stewart version

British rock singer Rod Stewart released a cover over a decade after the original Persuaders version, released as the second single from his 1984 album Camouflage. The most successful version to date, in Stewart's native country the single climbed to No. 15 on the UK Singles Chart. In the United States, the single peaked at No. 10 on the Billboard Hot 100 in October 1984, while on the US Cash Box Top 100, the single peaked at No. 16 in that same month. Stewart's version incorporated a vocal refrain from "Ain't Got No Home" by Clarence "Frogman" Henry.

Rod Stewart began using the Palmer-style arrangement in live concerts in 2003 after Palmer's death as a tribute, with live female backup vocalists and a horn player wearing identical dresses, similar to Palmer's signature music videos.

Track listing

7-inch single

 Some Guys Have All the Luck (7" Edit) - 4:03

12-inch single

 Some Guys Have All the Luck (LP version) - 4:36
 Some Guys Have All the Luck (Extended Version) - 6:32

Chart history

Other notable cover versions
The Shakers recorded it for their debut album Yankee Reggae (Elektra, 1976) and released the song as a single.
Reggae artist Junior Tucker recorded a version released by Island Records in 1980. Critic Robert Christgau wrote that the teenage Junior Tucker's "sweetly devastated" version was a "must-hear," and comparing it to Robert Palmer's later recording, he wrote that Tucker "owned" the song the way Sonic Youth's Kim Gordon owned "Addicted to Love."
Louise Mandrell recorded a country version of the song in 1985, altering the lyrics to the female perspective and changing the title to "Some Girls Have All the Luck". Mandrell's version peaked at No. 22 on the Billboard Hot Country Singles chart in 1986. A music video was filmed for the song.
Camera Obscura
Jacob Miller, 
Judge Dread,

References

Songs about luck
1973 singles
1984 singles
1985 singles
1986 singles
Robert Palmer (singer) songs
The Persuaders (R&B group) songs
Maxi Priest songs
Rod Stewart songs
Louise Mandrell songs
Song recordings produced by Eddie Kilroy
1973 songs
Atco Records singles
Island Records singles
Warner Records singles